L'orage africain: un continent sous influence is a 2017 Beninese drama film directed by Sylvestre Amoussou. The film won the Étalon de Yennenga prize (Yennenga Silver Standard) at the 2017 PanaFilm and Television Festival in Ouagadougou.

Cast 

 Sylvestre Amoussou
 Philippe Caroit
 Sandrine Bulteau
 Eriq Ebouaney
 Laurent Mendy
 Sandra Adjaho

References 

2017 films
Beninese drama films